Uhrynkivtsi is a village located on the Tupa River in Chortkiv Raion of Ternopil Oblast  in western Ukraine. Uhrynkivtsi is the administrative center of the village council, which also includes villages Berestok and Khartonivtsi. Before the imposed border changes following World War II, the village was located in eastern Poland. It belongs to Zalishchyky urban hromada, one of the hromadas of Ukraine. 

The population of the village in 2007 was 641.

The Head of the Village Council is Liubov Harvasiuk.

Until 18 July 2020, Uhrynkivtsi belonged to Zalishchyky Raion. The raion was abolished in July 2020 as part of the administrative reform of Ukraine, which reduced the number of raions of Ternopil Oblast to three. The area of Zalishchyky Raion was merged into Chortkiv Raion.

Notable residents
Renia Spiegel (1924–1942), Polish diarist killed during the Holocaust, known as "Polish Anne Frank"

Sources

References

External links 
 Zalishchyky Raion. Uhrynkivtsi.

Villages in Chortkiv Raion